Keith Allen DeLong (born August 14, 1967) is a former American football linebacker who played professionally in the National Football League (NFL) for the San Francisco 49ers from 1989 to 1993. He earned a Super Bowl ring in his rookie season, in Super Bowl XXIV.

DeLong is the son of SEC Legend and Outland Trophy winner Steve DeLong.  He is one of only a handful of father/son combinations who both played at the NFL level.  Both attended the University of Tennessee. He was married to Marla Murrah, the niece of country songwriter Roger Murrah, and they had three children, two daughters and a son.

References

1967 births
Living people
American football linebackers
San Francisco 49ers players
Tennessee Volunteers football players
Players of American football from San Diego